The Tiger General, subtitled The Memoirs of a Vietnamese Intelligence Chief, is a novel by John Havan. It was first published in 2011, and is a sequel to the 2008 novel Mandarin.

The plot
The protagonist, Hai, is the illegitimate son of Bach, the protagonist of the preceding work. A born survivor, Hai continually re-invents himself under the French, Viet Minh and Japanese regimes. At thirty-six years of age, he comes into his own and his rise is unstoppable, emerging as the 'Tiger General' in the South Vietnamese Republic.

The main part of the book is based on the communist Vietnamese spy, Pham Xuan An. who was a friend of the author many years.

Reviews

References

2011 novels
English-language novels
Novels set in Vietnam